Hamid Vahid-Dastjerdi also known as Hamid Vahid (born 1959) is an Iranian philosopher and Professor of Philosophy and the Head of the Analytic Philosophy Faculty at the Institute for Research in Fundamental Sciences. He is known for his expertise on epistemology, philosophy of mind and philosophical logic.
His works have been published in distinguished journals such as Philosophical Studies, Philosophy and Phenomenological Research, Synthese, Erkenntnis, European Journal of Philosophy, Kant-Studien, Metaphilosophy and Ratio.

Books
 The Dispositional Architecture of Epistemic Reasons, Routledge 2020, 
 The Epistemology of Belief, Palgrave Macmillan 2008, 
 Epistemic Justification and the Skeptical Challenge, Palgrave Macmillan 2005,

References

External links
 Hamid Vahid-Dastjerdi at the Institute for Research in Fundamental Sciences
 Works by Hamid Vahid

21st-century Iranian philosophers
Philosophy academics
Living people
1959 births
Sharif University of Technology alumni
Alumni of the University of Warwick
Alumni of the London School of Economics
Academic staff of the Institute for Research in Fundamental Sciences
Philosophers of mind
Epistemologists
Iranian logicians
Alumni of Hertford College, Oxford
20th-century Iranian philosophers